Mentesenot Adane (born 28 May 1993) is an Ethiopian footballer who plays as a midfielder for Saint George S.C.

International career
In January 2014, coach Sewnet Bishaw, invited him to be a part of the Ethiopia squad for the 2014 African Nations Championship. The team was eliminated in the group stages after losing to Congo, Libya and Ghana.

References

External links
 

Living people
1993 births
Ethiopian footballers
Ethiopia international footballers
Association football midfielders
Saint George S.C. players
Ethiopian Premier League players
Ethiopia A' international footballers
2014 African Nations Championship players
Place of birth missing (living people)